Matthew Rees (born 1980) is a Welsh former professional rugby union player.

Matthew Rees may also refer to:
 Matthew Rees (racing driver) (born 2005), Welsh racing driver
 Matthew Rees (footballer) (born 1982), Welsh footballer
 Matt Rees, Welsh novelist and journalist
 Matt Rees (comedian), Welsh comedian
 Matthew Rhys (born 1974), Welsh actor